Arvydas Eitutavičius (born 18 September 1982) is a Lithuanian professional basketball player who last played for BC Gargždai-SC of the National Basketball League. He attended Norfolk Collegiate School and Laurinburg Institute before enrolling to American University to play college basketball for the Eagles. Subsequently he pursued a professional career, playing for several clubs in Europe. Eitutavičius is a point guard.

Amateur career 
Eitutavičius left his homeland in 2001 to play high school basketball in the United States. He attended the Norfolk Collegiate School in Norfolk, Virginia for a year and the Laurinburg Institute in North Carolina for another year before enrolling into NCAA Division I's American University based in Washington, D.C. He saw little playing time during his freshman and sophomore years, but became the team's starting shooting guard in his junior and senior years. As a senior, he recorded 25.3 minutes, 11.6 points, 2.7 rebounds, 2.1 assists per game.

Professional career 
After graduation, he signed with Ciudad Real, a minor Spanish basketball team playing in Liga EBA. After starring in 24 games, Eitutavičius then played for CB Tíjola of the second-tier LEB league. There, however, he played only 2 games and recorded 12 points, 8 rebounds and 4 assists in 2 games. In 2008, he returned to his homeland and played for BC Neptūnas. He appeared in 29 games for the club, averaging 13.0 points per game, 3.9 rebounds per game, 3.1 assists per game and 1.1 steals per game in 28.8 minutes per game. The following season, he moved to Cholet Basket playing in Pro A. That season, his team won the Pro A championship and he was an important bench player for the team, averaging 6.8 points, 1.4 rebounds and 1.8 assists per game. He also debuted in Eurocup that season, averaging 9.8 points, 2.7 rebounds and 2.2 assists per game.

After the championship season, Eitutavičius signed with the Greek basketball club Iraklis. He appeared in 24 games for the club, averaging 7.5 points, 2.1 rebounds, 1.5 assists and 0.9 steals per game on 25.5 minutes per game. In the subsequent years, he moved around Eastern and Central Europe, playing in Czech Republic, Ukraine and Poland. In 2013, he once again returned to his homeland to play for BC Neptūnas. He appeared in 17 games for the club, averaging 4.1 points per game, 2.1 rebounds per game and 2.2 assists per game in 16.8 minutes per game. In August 2014 Eitutavičius returned to Anwil Włocławek.

Lithuania national basketball team 
Eitutavičius was a candidate to represent the Lithuania national basketball team at the 2010 FIBA World Championship. He played for the reserve team and was invited by coach Kęstutis Kemzūra to join the main roster. He, however, was released from the team one week prior to the start of the championship.

References

External links 
 Anwil Włocławek player profile
 DraftExpress profile
 EuroBasket profile
 EuroCup profile

1982 births
Living people
American Eagles men's basketball players
BC Neptūnas players
BC Khimik players
Cholet Basket players
Iraklis Thessaloniki B.C. players
KK Włocławek players
Lithuanian expatriate basketball people in France
Lithuanian expatriate basketball people in Greece
Lithuanian expatriate basketball people in Poland
Lithuanian expatriate basketball people in Spain
Lithuanian expatriate basketball people in the United States
Lithuanian men's basketball players
Point guards